Warlords is an arcade game released by Atari, Inc. in 1980. The game resembles a combination of Breakout and Quadrapong (an early Atari arcade game); up to four players play the game at the same time, and the "castles" in the four corners of the screen are brick walls that can be broken with a flaming ball.

Warlords used spinner controllers for player control and came in both a two-player upright version and a four-player cocktail version. The upright version used a black and white monitor and reflected the game image onto a mirror, with a backdrop of castles, giving the game a 3D feel. The upright version only supported up to two simultaneous players, who moved through the levels as a team. The cocktail version was in color and supported 1–4 players. Three-to-four player games were free-for-alls where the game ended as soon as one player won. One-to-two player games played identical to the upright version.

According to Atari production numbers, 1014 uprights and 1253 cocktails were produced.  The prototype version of Warlords was called "Castles and Kings" and was housed in a large four-player "Sprint 4-like" cabinet.  Only two versions of the prototype were made.  The game was considered a success, although a redesign to a smaller cabinet was necessary, as the large cabinet made it impossible to produce in large quantities and unfeasible to install.

Gameplay
Warlords is a battle between four warlords, 1-4 of which can be controlled by the player(s). The objective is to destroy the three other castles while protecting one's own castle with a moving shield.  Each castle is an L-shaped wall distinguished by a different color, each containing and protecting a Warlord icon (a crown for player-controlled Kings, a dark lord helmet for computer-controlled Black Knights).

The weapons for accomplishing this are spinning fireballs which bounce off anything they touch and destroy chunks of a castle wall on contact. Fireballs can be caught, held, and thrown by shields for greater hitting force, via a "Power stone" button, but at the cost of slowly deteriorating the player's own walls. When an icon is destroyed it releases another fireball onto the playfield, traveling in the opposite direction of the killing shot. The first fireball is launched by a dragon, always at a human player. Subsequent fireballs, up to a maximum of four at once, appear after timeouts or when a warlord icon is destroyed.

The last player with their icon intact is awarded a point bonus. A game ends when all human players are eliminated.

Development 
The Atari 2600 version of the game was released in 1981 and was written by Carla Meninsky. The debugger was Jerry Richardson.

The coin-op group developed the arcade version from the same "Castles and Kings" concept, adding and changing features to make the game more suitable for coin-operated play.

Reception
Critical reception of the game was positive. Warlords won an award for "Best 'Pong' Variant" and an honorable mention for "Best Competitive Game" at the 3rd annual Arkie Awards. Arkie Award judges characterized the game as "something really new and different in 'Pong'-style designs", and commented that Warlords "delivers plenty of on-screen excitement".

Richard A. Edwards reviewed the home cartridge version of Warlords in The Space Gamer No. 47. Edwards commented that "If you have a need for a multi-player game for your Atari, then that is it.  But for one or two players, it'd be better to pass it up."

In 2009 Game Informer ranked it the 25th best video game of all time. The staff called it the "original trash-talking four-player combat game" and felt that it held up years later.

Reviews
Games

Legacy
In 2002, a 3D remake of Warlords was included in the Atari Revival pack, which also included the previously released Missile Command and Combat 3D remakes.

A port of Warlords, including a "remix" version, is included in Retro Atari Classics for the Nintendo DS. It allows multiplayer play through wireless. It was released on the Xbox 360 via Xbox Live Arcade on May 27, 2008, featuring a new special HD mode and Xbox Live Vision Camera support.

The arcade and Atari 2600 versions of Warlords were made available on Microsoft's Game Room service for its Xbox 360 console and for Windows-based PCs in June 2010 and December 2010 respectively.

A new version of Warlords was released on PlayStation Network on October 9, 2012, in North America and October 10, 2012, in Europe. It was also released on Xbox Live Arcade on November 14, 2012. The Xbox Live Arcade version had been made available on Xbox One and Xbox Series through backward compatibility program on November 15, 2021.

In 2004, Bryan Edewaard developed and published an unlicensed homebrew version of Warlords for the Atari 5200 and Atari 8bit computers named Castle Crisis. In 2006, Darrell Spice Jr. released Medieval Mayhem, a homebrew Atari 2600 game inspired by Warlords. In 2011, a Commodore 64 clone was released as Space Lords. It supports a 4 player adapter.

In 1999, Working Designs included an 8 player remake of Warlords as an Easter Egg on the "Making of" disc in Lunar: Silver Star Story Complete.  The remake is titled "Lords of Lunar" by Timon Marmex Trezpacz and is accessed by pressing (up, down, left, right, triangle, start) as soon as the "Making of" video begins.

A remake of the game has been announced for release exclusively for the Intellivision Amico.

References

External links
 
 Warlords at the Arcade History database
 Warlords for the Atari 2600 at Atari Mania
 Warlords for the Atari 2600 at Atari Age

1980 video games
Action video games
Atari 2600 games
Atari arcade games
Paddle-and-ball video games
Xbox 360 Live Arcade games
Video games adapted into comics
Video games developed in the United States
Video games set in castles